is a Japanese manga series written and illustrated by Nakatake Shiryū. It was originally serialized in Kodansha's shōnen manga magazine Bessatsu Shōnen Magazine from March to October 2020, and was transferred to Magazine Pocket app and website since November 2020, with its chapters collected into ten tankōbon volumes as of March 2023.

Setting
Jūjika no Rokunin depicts the revenge of the main character on his bullies. In order to defeat several non-human monsters, the boy also became something non-human. Uruma Shun, a sixth-grade student, was named "Experimental body: A" by five of his classmates and was severely bullied and lived in hell. His only peace was with his brother, who loved him, and his parents, who protected him.... . until the five monsters killed his family. When he finally loses everything and faces true hell, a dark "wish" is born inside Shun. He was reborn under the training of his grandfather, who served in a secret unit during WWII. Now, four years later, he appears in front of his Bloody enemies. After killing four of his bullies Kyou Shigoku the leader reveals that he has a cult called the revolution club which has him killed his grandpa and brother leaving him alone. Uruma was arrested for 5 years and in the time skip lost his memories and joined Juujika.

Characters

A kind-hearted high-school boy whose parents were killed and younger brother hospitalized by childhood bullies when he was only 12-years-old, leading him down a path of vengeance on the five. Shun Uruma was bullied by five classmates when he was in elementary school. The abuse was so horrific that it left Shun Uruma physically and mentally scarred. Despite this, he vows to avenge his parents' death and younger brother's comatose on the bullies who have made his life horrible during his high school years. He succeeded in killing four of them and planned on taking down Kyou himself, but the mastermind had formed new allies and was the leader of a cult, which surprised Shun himself. After the match, he failed to kill Kyou, who had escaped with Andou, and was arrested on suspicion of murdering Anzai Zenichi for 5 years. Sometimes after his sentence in prison, Uruma, now 20 years old, somehow lost his memories, met Kitami and joined Juujika.

He is the main antagonist of the manga and is also the leader of Uruma's group of bullies who tormented him in his childhood. Kyou sets himself apart as completely apathetic, cruel, and psychopathic compared to the other four. He is a talented person who has passed the prefectural preparatory school with a perfect score and aspires to the medical school, but he continues to bully him by calling him "experiment" how much he should bully Shun Uruma to commit suicide. He is the earliest to notice Shun Uruma's revenge and is said to seem to enjoy his revenge. After the death of the bullies, it is revealed that he amassed a cult with many followers. He later had Uruma and Jun play a match that led to the deaths of Kaname, Kakaru and Shun Uruma Sr. before escaping with Andou and Momoki. 5 years later, Kyou has longer hair and his scar is healed with his cult now growing in numbers.

He is an elderly man of average height and average build, as well as short white hair and a scar on his left eye. He once belonged to the Kure Naval District 100th Special Land Squadron (commonly known as Kitayama Squadron) during World War II, which was a group of skilled assassins. Knowing that his grandson Shun Uruma, genuinely wanted revenge on the monsters who made his life a living hell,, Grandpa taught Shun Uruma how to murder and torture people. He was later killed by one of Kyou's henchmen, Andou Midori.

He is the younger brother of Shun Uruma. He has a cheerful personality and a gentle side, such as petting abandoned cats. It is said that he felt lightly that his brother was being bullied. After the transfer of his brother Shun Uruma was decided, he was in a car with his parents and suffered a traffic accident by Kyou, and became unconscious as a result. He later dies at the hands of Kyou as the latter stabs the former with a knife behind his back.

He is one of the five bullies who mistreated Shun Uruma in their childhood. Shun Uruma and Daichi Kuga are the same in high school, and the big monster continues to mistreat his victim even when they are in high school. Daichi Kuga was a fierce man who won the national junior high school judo tournament in the 90 kg class, and when he mistreated Shun Uruma, he used violence and physically damaged him. Later Shun beats him and later kills him as the fourth victim.

Ushiro Yuuga is also a member of the group who bullied Shun Uruma. He is a playboy who is called "Yarichin" in the sixth grade of elementary school. Yuuga is involved in crimes such as prostitution and drug trafficking in high school. In addition, Yuga is a deluded teenager who confined a girl by the name of Karen Sakuraba at his home and sexually assaulted her. Later he is tortured by Shun and Karen, eventually dying as the second victim.

He is a member of the group that bullied Shun Uruma. He is a fanatic who can lick his shoes without hesitation if he is to be recognized by Kyou. One of his special talents is creating poisonous drinks and forcing people to drink them. He attacks Shun Uruma at the school festival in order to earn Kyou's approval, only to fail and instead raping Kaname as a result of her eavesdropping on his plan to attack Uruma. He later becomes Shun's third victim.

Senkouji Katsumi is also a member of the bullying group. He was originally on good terms with Shun Uruma until he resorted to bullying his former friend by shooting Shun with an air gun. Senkouji later became the first target of his victim's revenge, dying after being tortured severely by Uruma.

A girl from Shun's class who develops feelings for him.The time skip has her return in a new job with longer hair and reunites with Uruma, who lost his memories while working under Kitami.

The younger twin sister of Jun and childhood friend of Uruma. She was raped by Hiro Madoka and later dies at the hands of Kyou's cultists.

The older twin brother of Kaname, he is very protective of her and is also a childhood friend of Shun. At some point in the story, when his younger sister gets raped, he mistakenly believes that Uruma was responsible for his younger sister's rape, causing him to join Kyou's cult just so he could inflict suffering on Uruma before realizing his mistake and later switching sides to make up for the suffering he caused him. His fate regarding the incident involving him, Kyou's cult, and Uruma is left ambiguous.

A cop who investigated Shun and the bullies before getting killed by the former later on in the story. His recording of his incident with Uruma would later allow his assistant, Oota, to arrest Uruma and prevent him from committing his final revenge, leading to the second part of the story.

Anzai's partner involved in the case revolving around the accident that took the life of Shun Uruma's parents. She is described as being an easy-going and dorky person in spite of her job as a police officer. In addition, she is also very kind as she offers Uruma housing when his house was burned by Kuga Daichi. However, those traits would soon disappear once she discovers Uruma's true colors and his murder of Anzai Zenichi. Because of this, she becomes more serious yet antagonistic and cold towards Uruma by the time she arrests him for murdering Anzai Zenichi.
Ganno
A minion of Ushiro who was sent by the psychopath to rape Azuma Chizuru. Being gigantic for a teenager himself, he is also very abusive and misogynistic as he views women as sex objects and even threatens to beat those who dare resist his sexual advances. At some point, when he attempts to attack Azuma, he is confronted by "Bikerman" (who is actually Shun Uruma wearing a bicycle helmet to cover up his identity) and the bigger man seems to have gained the upper hand in their fight only for the tables to turn once Uruma dislocates the bigger monster's joints, permanently.
Maki
A prostitute who works under Ushiro.
Daki Kawashima
A servant of Ushiro.
Andou Midori
A member of the Revolutions Club. Being the most loyal cultist out of the four (including Miguel, Momoki, and Nogi), he is very talented in not only combat, but also torturing other people. Ever since Kyou taught him how to properly torture people, he has been loyal to the psychopath ever since. He is responsible for not only kidnapping Shun's younger brother, Kakeru, but is also responsible for mutilating the young child's leg and later murdering Uruma Shun Sr. After the events revolving around the match, he, Kyou, and Momoki, all escaped before the police arrives to arrest them. Five years later, he is seen, along with Momoki and two other unidentified researchers, meeting up with Shigoku Kyou during a meeting.

A member of the Revolutions Club. Being a tall and muscular man, he is very charismatic and well-mannered in spite of his appearance. However, like the other members of the Revolutions Club, he is just as twisted, cruel, and violent as they are when it comes to torturing any members of the club. He gets his left eye gouged out by Uruma (which didn't affect him that much) before attempting to twist his head, although he later gets killed off by Gramps as the elder man rips out his vein, instantly killing him.
Sana Momoki
A member of the Revolutions Club. Being the most attractive and quietest member of the Revolutions Club, she is seen witnessing all the events revolving around the Revolutions Club. In addition, she later takes Uruma to his and Kyou's former elementary school to a "match". While the match begins, she mutilates Kaname twice when Jun lost 2 rounds of "Rock, Paper, Scissors" before wheeling her lifeless body to the older twin brother. She also holds Kakeru hostage before Andou attempts to kill the both of them, only for her to get out of the way before she gets killed. She is later seen in her attempt to protect Kyou from a berserk Uruma who kicks her in the face, knocking her unconscious. Despite this, she managed to escape the gym, along with Andou and Kyou, before getting arrested by the cops. Five years later, she is seen entering a room with Andou and two other unidentified researchers to meet up with Kyou.
Takashi Nogi
A member of the Revolutionary Club. Being the shortest member of the Revolutions Club, he is very bad-tempered and prone to using violence towards anyone in general. He was seen holding Kakeru hostage with a knife when threatening Uruma if he didn't participate in the Rock-Paper-Scissors match with Shirakawa Jun. At some point, he repeatedly kicks Uruma in the head while berating him after the latter's remaining family members die before the short man gets his face ripped off by the surviving member, who also punches the cultist in the head, knocking him to the ground and effectively killing him.
Karen Sakuraba
A girl who was kidnapped and abused by Ushiro, she later gets her revenge on her abusive boyfriend before committing suicide.
Mr. and Mrs Uruma
Shun's parents who were killed by the bullies.

Kyou's cousin and Kuga's girlfriend who is later killed by the latter.
Kitami Kougo
The leader of "Juujika-san" who helps people kill their tormentors as long as they pay him a lot of money. The mysterious leader of the group, he disguises his assassination business as a "clinic" so that he could be able to run it without getting caught by the police. Uruma ends up working for him ever since the post-timeskip ostensibly to make up for his failures in killing Kyou (though it was revealed that he lost his memories of everything that happened in the past, implying that he joined Kitami as a way of making a living).
Mimi Kawana
Kitami's assistant.

Publication
Jūjika no Rokunin, written and illustrated by Nakatate Shiryū, began serialization in Kodansha's monthly shōnen manga magazine Bessatsu Shōnen Magazine on March 9, 2020. The manga was serialized in the magazine until October 9 of the same year, and was then transferred to the publisher's Magazine Pocket online platform starting on November 5 of the same year. Kodansha has collected its chapters into individual tankōbon volumes. The first volume was released on August 7, 2020. As of December 9, 2022, nine volumes have been released.

Volume list

Reception
As of March 2022, the manga had over 1 million copies in circulation.

Popularity

The manga Jūjika no Rokunin is said to be popular for its themes revolving around bullying and revenge. In May 2022, the grandfather of Shun Uruma ranked first on the first day of the character popularity vote for the series. The results of the first day bulletin from the character popularity voting project was announced on May 20, and Shun Uruma Sr. reached first place as nearly 50% of the votes were for the man on the first day of the voting poll, May 19th. The person in charge said, "I have voted for popularity in various works, but it is the first time that 50% of all people vote for the same character. Moreover, that is the supporting character grandpa. I'm not a funny character. I'm surprised because I didn't expect it at all." Grandpa, who won 1st place in the popularity votes, is said to be "difficult" in the latest story currently being released, and it seems that the future of the popularity vote will attract more attention. The character popularity voting project accepted votes on the campaign site until May 25th. The "Revenge Note" on the cover of the 1st place character were presented to 3 people through a lottery among the voters. We solicited works under the theme of "Draw your despair" and produced Attack on Titan by Hajime Isayama. It was also talked about that Jūjika no Rokunin passed the competition for the first time in about 10 years since Attack on Titan. The final result of the character popularity voting project for Kodansha's web manga service "Magapoke" serialized by Nakatake Shiryū's manga Jūjika no Rokunin was announced, and the main character, Shun Uruma's grandpa, took first place. Of the total number of votes of 17,675, about half of them, 8633, were given to Grandpa. The project started accepting votes on May 19, and it became interesting that about 50% of the votes obtained were gathered by grandpa in the breaking news on the first day followed by Kaname Shirakawa, who received 3007 votes (second place) and Shun Uruma Jr., who received 2698 votes (third place).

It is said that Jūjika no Rokunin did not become very popular when it was first serialized in Bessatsu Shōnen Magazine in March 2020. The serialization ended in the October 2020 issue of the magazine due to sluggish sales of the first volume of the comic. After that, Jūjika no Rokunin transferred from the magazine to the online app Magazine Pocket 
. Surprisingly, the manga became one of the most popular mangas in the app, causing 3 of its volumes to be reprinted. The popularity of electronic comics is high, and sales of electronic versions are about 6.6 times than that of their in-print counterparts.
In addition to the cumulative number of stories viewed exceeding 13 million times, the second volume of the manga, which was released on February 9, 2021,  boasted the top sales in the suspense genre of Magazine Pocket. The entire manga was announced to be free for two days on March 18 and 19. Afterwards, the popularity among the readers of Magazine Pocket skyrocketed, causing the manga's popularity to score even higher in the app. Later on, sales of the electronic versions of the first two volumes have increased.

References

External links
  

Drama anime and manga
Kodansha manga
Psychological thriller anime and manga
Shōnen manga